Elections in the Republic of India in 1992 included elections to the Punjab Legislative Assembly, seats in the Rajya Sabha and the elections to the posts of President and vice president.

Legislative Assembly elections

Punjab

|- align=center
!style="background-color:#E9E9E9" class="unsortable"|
!style="background-color:#E9E9E9" align=center|Political Party
!style="background-color:#E9E9E9" |No. of Candidates
!style="background-color:#E9E9E9" |Seats won
!style="background-color:#E9E9E9" |Number of Votes
!style="background-color:#E9E9E9" |% of Votes
|-
| 
|align="left"|Indian National Congress||116||87||13,17,075||43.83%
|-
| 
|align="left"|Shiromani Akali Dal||58||3||1,56,171||5.20%
|-
| 
|align="left"|Bharatiya Janata Party||66||6||4,95,161||16.48%
|-
| 
|align="left"|Communist Party of India||20||4||1,09,386||3.64%
|-
| 
|align="left"|Bahujan Samaj Party||105||9||4,90,552||17.59%
|-
| 
|align="left"|Communist Party of India (M)||17||1||72,061||2.40%
|-
|
|align="left"|Indian People's Front||2||1||2,292||0.08%
|-
| 
|align="left"|Janata Dal||37||1||64,666||2.15%
|-
| 
|align="left"|Independents||151||4||2,77,706||9.24%
|-
|
|align="left"|Total||579||117|| 30,05,083||
|-
|}

Rajya Sabha

President

Source: Web archive of Election Commission of India website

Vice-president

|- align=center
!style="background-color:#E9E9E9" class="unsortable"|
!style="background-color:#E9E9E9" align=center|Candidate
!style="background-color:#E9E9E9" |Party
!style="background-color:#E9E9E9" |Electoral Votes
!style="background-color:#E9E9E9" |% of Votes
|-
| 
|align="left"|K. R. Narayanan||align="left"|INC||700||99.86
|-
|
|align="left"|Kaka Joginder Singh||align="left"|Independent||1||0.14
|-
| colspan="5" style="background:#e9e9e9;"|
|-
! colspan="3" style="text-align:left;"| Total
! style="text-align:right;"|701
! style="text-align:right;"|100.00
|-
| colspan="5" style="background:#e9e9e9;"| 
|-
|-
|colspan="3" style="text-align:left;"|Valid Votes||701||98.59
|-
|colspan="3" style="text-align:left;"|Invalid Votes||10||1.41
|-
|colspan="3" style="text-align:left;"|Turnout||711||90.00
|-
|colspan="3" style="text-align:left;"|Abstentions||79||10.00
|-
|colspan="3" style="text-align:left;"|Electors||790|| style="background:#e9e9e9;"|
|-
|}

References

External links
 

1992 elections in India
India
1992 in India
Elections in India by year